Milan Jovanović may refer to:

 Milan Jovanović (photographer) (1863–1944), Serbian photographer
 Milan Jovanović (strongman) (born 1970), Serbian powerlifter
 Milan Jovanović (footballer, born 1981), Serbian footballer
 Milan Jovanović (footballer, born July 1983), Montenegrin footballer
 Milan Jovanović (footballer, born October 1983), Serbian footballer
 Milan Jovanović (handballer) (born 1998), Serbian handball player

See also
 Jovanović (surname)